The Order José Martí (Orden José Martí) is a state honor in Cuba. The Order was named so after José Martí, the national hero of Cuba. The design was realized by the Cuban sculptor José Delarra.

Notable recipients

  Alexander Lukashenko, (President of Belarus)
  Mohammad Najibullah, (Former General Secretary Of The People's Democratic Party of Afghanistan)
  Armando Hart
  Antonio Gades
  António Mascarenhas Monteiro
  Michael Manley
  Leonid Brezhnev, (former General Secretary of the Communist Party of the Soviet Union)
  Jiang Zemin, (former General Secretary of the Chinese Communist Party)
  Houari Boumediene
  Xi Jinping, (General Secretary of the Chinese Communist Party)
  Ali Abdullah Saleh, (former President of Yemen)
  Kim Il-sung, (General Secretary of the Workers' Party of Korea)
  Thomas Sankara
  Todor Zhivkov
  Salvador Allende
  Nicolae Ceaușescu
  Owen Arthur
  Hugo Chávez, (President of Venezuela)
  Gustáv Husák, (former President of Czechoslovakia)
  Mengistu Haile Mariam
  Rafael Cancel Miranda
  Robert Mugabe
  Sam Nujoma
  Erich Honecker
  Felipe González
  Julius Nyerere
  Omar Torrijos
  Jacob Zuma.
  Viktor Yanukovych
  Nguyễn Phú Trọng (General Secretary of the Communist Party of Vietnam)
  Tomislav Nikolić(former President of Serbia) 
  Vladimir Putin (President of Russia)
  Yumjaagiin Tsedenbal, (former President of Mongolia)
  Demetris Christofias
  Saddam Hussein, (former President of Iraq)
  Abdullah Ahmad Badawi
  Fanny Edelman
  Marien Ngouabi (People's Republic of the Congo) 
  Nicolás Maduro, (President of Venezuela)
  Nguyễn Xuân Phúc (former President of Vietnam)
  João Bernardo Vieira (President of Guinea-Bissau)
  Andrés Manuel López Obrador (President of Mexico)
  Ralph Gonsalves (Prime Minister of Saint Vincent and the Grenadines)

See also
International José Martí Prize
José Martí
 Orders, decorations, and medals of Cuba

References

External links
Images of the Order of José Martí

Jose Marti
Awards established in 1972
1972 establishments in Cuba